"Highlife" is a song by American hip hop group Cypress Hill. The song was released as a single from the group's fifth album, Skull & Bones.

Track listing

Personnel
 B-Real – vocals
 Sen Dog – vocals
 DJ Muggs – producer

Chart positions

Notes

A  "Highlife" and "Can't Get the Best of Me" were released together as a double A-side in the United Kingdom.

References

2000 songs
2000 singles
Cypress Hill songs
Columbia Records singles
Hardcore hip hop songs
Songs written by DJ Muggs
Songs written by B-Real
Songs written by Sen Dog
Song recordings produced by DJ Muggs